Starcrawler is an American rock band from Los Angeles, formed in 2015. The band consists of lead singer Arrow de Wilde, guitarist Henri Cash, bassist Tim Franco and drummer Seth Carolina, pedal steel/guitar player Bill Cash. They have released three studio albums: Starcrawler (2018), Devour You (2019) and She Said (2022).

Starcrawler lead singer Arrow de Wilde and guitarist Henri Cash both attended Los Angeles' Grand Arts High School. De Wilde is the child of photographer Autumn de Wilde and drummer Aaron Sperske.

History

Origins
In the summer of 2015, Arrow de Wilde and Austin Smith came together to collaborate in making music. When the school year began in 2015/2016, the two decided to recruit new members, a guitarist and bassist. One day during school Wilde saw Henri Cash and asked, "You look cool, do you play guitar?" Cash was actually carrying a tuba. Wilde later recruited bassist Tim Franco. In an interview with FY Magazine when asked about the origins of the name Starcrawler drummer Austin Smith said, "It’s something I just came up with, random word association." Arrow also added, "We got our first show booked and didn't have a name."

2017–2018: Early period and debut album 
Starcrawler's debut 7", "Ants" / "Used To Know", was released in 2017 on red/white splatter vinyl with a picture sleeve in a limited edition of 500, which sold out quickly.

Starcrawler released their first 7" single from their debut album, "I Love LA" / "Castaway", on Rough Trade Records on February 16, 2018. The single features a photo of the band on the front and back labels, and comes in a pink sleeve.

In March 2018, Starcrawler performed a number of shows at the world's biggest music showcase, South By Southwest (SXSW), in Austin, Texas. Their performances gained notoriety for their energy and antics. During their final gig at SXSW, lead singer de Wilde terrorized the crowd by spitting blood in the face of a photographer, hurling attendees' personal possessions into the crowd, and snot-rocketing in the face of another member of the audience. Starcrawler won the Grulke Prize for Developing U.S. Act at SXSW for their performances at the festival.

Starcrawler performed their singles "Love's Gone Again" and "I Love LA" live on Later With Jools Holland on May 29, 2018, before starting their 2018 European Tour. The tour ran from May 30 to June 23 and included concerts in Spain, Luxembourg, Germany, Portugal, United Kingdom, Austria, France and the Netherlands.

The band's self-titled debut album Starcrawler was released that year by Rough Trade Records on both white vinyl and black vinyl. 200 copies were also pressed on white vinyl with an alternate cover.

2018–2020: Devour You
Starcrawler released the single "Hollywood Ending" along "Tank Top" as a B-side on November 16, 2018.

On February 26, 2019, Starcrawler released the second single "She Gets Around" that recalls '90s alternative rock bands like Nirvana and The Breeders with heavy power chords and Arrow's outstanding vocal performance who snarls the tune's dark lyrics in between enthusiastic growls and howls.

The band participated in the motion picture soundtrack for the film Pet Sematary by making a cover of the Ramones song with the same title and was uploaded on April 5, 2019.

On October 11, the band released their second studio album Devour You.

2020–present: She Said
On August 2, 2020, De Wilde stated on an Instagram post that she was sexually assaulted in a dressing room by a male stripper earlier in January while on tour with The Growlers in Melbourne, Australia. She said her bandmates were locked out of the dressing room while the assault took place, and that while none of The Growlers band members directly participated in the act, they laughed and filmed the incident, in which she repeatedly attempted to leave but was held down. Starcrawler's guitarist, Henri Cash, later made a statement that De Wilde's claims were true, and that the band had tried to enter the room in which the incident took place, but to no avail. Lead singer of The Growlers, Brooks Nielsen, who was said to have orchestrated the incident, issued an apology on Instagram, and stated that guitarist Matt Taylor had taken temporary leave despite denying the allegations.

On October 8, Austin Smith announced on Instagram his departure from the band, citing in a post that he needed the time to "[find] the joy of life with family and friends," and to take a "much needed break". The band later confirmed Austin's departure stating that he's "no longer playing in Starcrawler", and that they "wish him well in the future."

Starcrawler released their third album, She Said, on September 16, 2022 via Big Machine Records.

Critical reception 
In a performance review in The Guardian the band was described as "Blending the sludgy, doom-laden riffs of Black Sabbath with the urgent pop-punk of The Runaways, the young LA band Starcrawler are a group whose entire DNA seems linked to the 1970s."

Band members 

Current members
 Arrow de Wilde - vocals (2015-present)
 Bill Cash - pedal steel (2020-present)
 Henri Cash - guitar (2015-present)
 Tim Franco - bass (2016-present)
 Seth Carolina - drums (2020-present)

Former members
 Austin Smith - drums (2015-2020)

Discography

Studio albums
 Starcrawler (2018)
 Devour You (2019)
She Said (2022)

Extended plays
 Acoustic Sessions (2023)

Singles
 "Ants" / "Used to Know" (2017)
 "Let Her Be" (2017)
 "I Love LA" / "Castaway" (2018)
 "Love's Gone Again" (2018)
 "Chicken Woman" (2018)
 "Hollywood Ending" / "Tank Top" (2018)
 "She Gets Around" (2019)
 "Pet Sematary" (2019)
 "Bet My Brains" (2019)
 "No More Pennies" (2019)
 “Live At Third Man” ("Lizzy" / "Bet My Brains") (2020)
 "I Need To Know" ft. Mike Campbell (2020)
 "Roadkill" (2022) No. 40 Alternative Airplay
 "She Said" (2022)
 "Stranded" (2022)
 "Broken Angels" (2022)
 "Stranded (Acoustic)" (2022)

Music videos

Miscellaneous musical appearances and collaborations
 Contributed the song "Ants" to Rough Trade Shops: Counter Culture 17 (2017).
 Contributed the song "Pet Sematary" to Pet Sematary Soundtrack (2019).
 Contributed the song "Let Her Be (live)" to City / Valley : a Live Recording of the Brekfest Festival (2019).
 Featured on the track "Turn Over The World" on Perry Farrell's album The Glitz ; The Glamour  Boxset (2021).
 Contributed the song "Goodtime Girl" to Dark Nights: Death Metal Soundtrack (2021).
 Contributed the song "If You're Gonna Be Dumb, You Gotta Be Tough" to Jackass 4.5 (2022).

Filmography

Documentary
 City / Valley : A Concert Film of The Brekfest Festival (2019)
 What Drives Us (2021)

References

External links

2015 establishments in California
Rock music groups from California
Big Machine Records artists
Rough Trade Records artists
Musical groups from Los Angeles
Musical quartets
Musical groups established in 2015